Ọlátúbọ̀sún Oládàpọ̀, also known as Túbọ́sún Ọládàpọ̀, or Odídẹrẹ́ Ayékòótọ́ (born 19 September 1943), is a Yoruba-language folk poet, playwright, music producer, radio personality/broadcaster, writer, and researcher from Nigeria whose audience speaks Yorùbá and resides chiefly in South-West Nigeria.

Life, literary and broadcasting career
Born Abraham Ọlátúbọ̀sún Ọládàpọ̀, he attended Phillip's Primary School in Ararọmi Owu, Osun State in 1950, then went to St. James’ Olanla in Akinyele, Ibadan from 1951 to 1954, and later attended the University of Lagos.

He underwent training at St. Luke's Teachers’ Training College, Ibadan, where he first started performing poetry with a presentation at the school in the 1965 festival of arts where he chanted Ìjálá Yorùbá oral poetry. He completed that in 1967 and was posted to St. David's School, Kudeti, Ibadan. He has said: "It was at St. Luke’s that my talent in drama was discovered, and it was on account of this that I was sent to the University of Lagos to study for a diploma in Yorùbá Studies free of charge. I came out with a distinction in that programme."

In 1969 he joined "The Sketch newspaper", GbounGboun, a Yorùbá newspaper, where he worked for a year before moving in 1970 to Western Nigeria Television (WNTV), Western Nigeria Broadcasting Service (WNBS). There he met the likes of Adebayo Faleti, who impacted on him greatly and Prince Adebayo Sanda, the presenter of Kaaro Ooojiire and Tiwa N’tiwa. Oladapo resigned in 1977 to found a record company, Olatubosun Records, to seek out, promote and produce indigenous-language artists and folk poets across the Yorùbá country.

He has produced more than 51 different albums and produced 200 artistes’ records on the label, including the Late Ọ̀jọ̀gbọ́n Ògúndáre Fọ́yánmu from Ògbómọ̀ṣọ́, Odòlayé Àrẹ̀mú from Kwara, Àyányẹmí Atoko wá gbowó nílé – the talking-drum specialist; Àlàbí Ògúndépò, and Duro Ladipo International Theatre, among others. His personal Yoruba poetry (ewì) albums typically feature Yorùbá poetry recited over an orchestra of folk music. Oládàpọ̀'s back-up choir once included the famous "K-12 Voices" led by the now-deceased Diípọ̀ Ṣódiípọ̀.

Writing
Oladapo has released about 29 different books, some of which are used as recommended text across primary and secondary schools and Universities in Nigeria and abroad.

He is the author of print collections of poetry, Àròyé Akéwì (1 and 2) and Àròfọ̀ Àwọn Ọmọdé. His plays Ògún Lákáayé and Ẹ̀gbádé Fáladé were joint prize winners of the Oxford University Press drama competition in 1970.

Olatubosun Records
Ọlátúbọ̀sún Records Company (also sometimes called Ọlátúbọ̀sún Records) is an indigenous language record label founded by Olatubosun Oladapo in 1977. It produced more than two hundred record albums of notable Yorùbá language poets and performers including Odolaye Aremu, Batile Alake, Ogundare Foyanmu, Duro Ladipo, Alabi Ogundepo, and very many others -- including Tubosun Oladapo himself.

References 

1943 births
Living people
Nigerian poets
Yoruba writers
Writers from Ibadan
Yoruba-language writers
Yoruba-language poets
Nigerian folklorists
University of Lagos alumni
Olatubosun Oladapo family